Uversnatten Rock is a small rock eminence 1 nautical mile (1.9 km) west of Huldreslottet Mountain, at the south end of Borg Massif in Queen Maud Land. Mapped by Norwegian cartographers from surveys and air photos by Norwegian-British-Swedish Antarctic Expedition (NBSAE) (1949–52) and named Uversnatten.

Rock formations of Queen Maud Land
Princess Martha Coast